Belize, formerly known as British Honduras, is a Caribbean country located on the northeastern coast of Central America. Belize is bordered on the northwest by Mexico, on the east by the Caribbean Sea, and on the south and west by Guatemala. It has the lowest population and population density in Central America.

Since records began in 1851, only two hurricanes have had 
Category 5 hurricane strength and have hit or hit close by to Belize, with the two being Hurricane Janet in 1955 and Hurricane Dean in 2007. Along with only two storms of Category 5 strength impacting Belize, only three Category 4 hurricanes have impacted Belize, including the 1931 British Honduras hurricane, Hurricane Keith in 2000, and Hurricane Iris in 2001. The most recent tropical cyclone to hit Belize was Hurricane Lisa.

Climatology
About once a decade, a major hurricane strikes the nation of Belize, located on the eastern Yucatán peninsula.

Pre 1900s

1900s 
September 10, 1931 - A Category 4 hurricane struck Belize City; it killed 2,500 people, making it the deadliest hurricane in the country's history.
October 31, 1961 - Hurricane Hattie makes landfall in Belize, causing enough damage to Belize City that the capital city was forced to move inland.

2000s 

October 1, 2000 - Hurricane Keith stalls off shore of Belize, killing 19 people and causing $280 million in damage. As Keith stalled offshore Belize, water was blown out of Chetumal Bay, with reports of people walking on the dry bay floor, even though the water could return with a slight shift in the wind direction. In mainland Belize, wind gusts reached  at the Philip S. W. Goldson International Airport. Many areas of Belize lost power and telephone service, which included Belize City. More than 130 houses were destroyed in mainland Belize, and two roofs of hotels had been destroyed. On the islands of San Pedro and Caye Caulker, 90 percent of roofs on homes had been damaged and 676 houses were destroyed, leaving 3,729 people homeless. Rain also raised rivers including the New River, Belize River, and the Hondo River. Overall, there was $280 million in damage, and 19 people were killed.
August 21, 2001 - Tropical Storm Chantal makes landfall in northern Belize, producing strong winds and moderate rainfall. Large waves also damaged sea walls and piers.
October 9, 2001 - Hurricane Iris makes landfall in Monkey River Town, Belize as a small but powerful Category 4 hurricane with 145 mile per hour winds, killing 24 people and causing $250 million in damage. Even though Iris made landfall with 145 mile per hour winds, the peak winds that were recorded were 106 miles per hour in Big Creek, Belize. In 35 villages, 95 percent of buildings had been destroyed, although most of the damage was confined to the Toledo and Stann Creek District, with 72 percent of buildings in the Toledo District and 50 percent of the Stann Creek District destroyed, which left around 15,000 people homeless. Some tourist related areas had been damaged, including the Maya ruins of Belize, and 20 percent of hotel rooms had been damaged. The Wave Dancer, a  scuba diving boat capsized after possibly being hit by a tornado in Big Creek, Belize. 28 people, including 20 from the Richmond Dive Club, had been on the boat when it capsized. Iris ripped apart the ropes connecting the boat to the dock, causing it to capsize and quickly flood the boat. Eight people survived, 11 bodies were recovered, and nine other people were presumed dead, including 15 from Richmond and three crew members.
August 21, 2007 - Hurricane Dean makes landfall on just north of Belize, bringing strong winds, rain, and storm surge. Corozal Town, being near the Mexican-Belize border, was one of the worst affected towns, with powerlines downed and trees uprooted, though damage was less than originally expected. The crop industry in Belize was heavily impacted; almost 30$ million (BZ dollar) of papaya and 3.6$ million (BZ dollar) of sugar was damaged by the storm. As a result of the loss of papaya, almost 1,000 people ended up losing their jobs. The prime minister of Belize at the time, Said Musa, said that it would cost 10$ million (USD) to repair or replace all the damaged homes.
May 31, 2008 - Tropical Storm Arthur

2010s
June 27, 2010 - Hurricane Alex
October 25, 2010 - Hurricane Richard
August 20, 2011 - Tropical Storm Harvey
June 17, 2013 - Tropical Storm Barry
August 4, 2016 - Hurricane Earl
August 8, 2017 - Hurricane Franklin

2020s
September 1, 2020 - Hurricane Nana
November 2, 2022 - Hurricane Lisa

Climatology

See also 

Hurricanes in Central America
Hurricanes in Honduras
Hurricanes in Costa Rica
Hurricanes in Nicaragua

References